The 1989–90 season was Port Vale's 78th season of football in the English Football League, and first (33rd overall) season back in the Second Division following their promotion from the Third Division. They were playing in the second tier, and at the same level as rivals Stoke City, for the first time since 1956–57. John Rudge led his side to a comfortable mid-table finish, whilst Stoke suffered relegation in bottom place despite the two derby matches finishing in draws. After beating top-flight Derby County, Vale exited the FA Cup at the Fourth Round with their biggest ever loss in the competition, losing 6–0 to Aston Villa at Villa Park. They left both the League Cup and the Full Members Cup at the Second Round.

Overview

Second Division
The pre-season saw John Rudge sign solid young defender Neil Aspin from Leeds United for £150,000; 28-year-old forward Nicky Cross from Leicester City for £125,000; and veteran winger Ian Miller on a free transfer from Blackburn Rovers (as cover for an injured Gary Ford). The Burslem club had never previously spent anything close to the £275,000 spent in summer 1989, yet other clubs in the division far outspent the Vale. Vale Park was also upgraded at a cost of £250,000, though grants helped to halve the cost for the club itself. Despite this effort, inspectors closed the Bycars End down due to safety issues, and reduced the stadium's capacity to 12,000 after cutting the capacity of the Railway Paddock by two-thirds. Season ticket sales more than doubled to 2,231. Phil Sproson attempted to return to the game and so the club accepted a £50,000 transfer payment from Birmingham City. Meanwhile the Vale were the bookmakers favourites for relegation, having started the season with six players out injured, including Ray Walker.

The season opened with a 2–2 draw with Bradford City at Valley Parade, and a 2–1 home win over West Bromwich Albion the following week. The club soon scrapped their all-ticket rule after poor attendances in the first games. Vale went seven games without a win in the league, though on 23 September managed a 1–1 draw with Stoke at the Victoria Ground, some 27,004 fans in attendance. The police bills for Vale games reached as much as £1.50 a head for some games, though the police went some way to justify this cost by arresting 85 people on the day of the Potteries derby. Rudge switched from a 4–4–2 formation to 4–3–3 so as to include Miller, and a mini-revival followed, ending with a 3–0 win over Barnsley at Oakwell. Six games without a win followed, and Alan Webb broke his leg during a 2–2 draw with Newcastle United at St James' Park. In November, Vale Park opened a new 48 seat disabled stand at a cost of £100,000. Ron Futcher was then sold to Fourth Division Burnley for £60,000, though an injury crisis in defence exposed the club's lack of squad depth. With Gary West out with damaged ligaments, big defender Tim Parkin was bought from Swindon Town for £60,000. The next month the Hamil End was reopened after £175,000 worth of renewal work. Rudge switched back to 4–4–2, utilizing Andy Porter in midfield.

Vale went six games unbeaten over the new year, beating Ipswich Town 5–0 (their biggest win in the division since 1932) and fighting to a goalless home draw with Stoke in the process. The Stoke game was a disappointment as City were adrift at the foot of the table, and the pitch was 'as lumpy as porridge'. The Bycars End reopened after a £90,000 investment, 22,075 fans turned up for the game – the biggest gate for a league game since the visit of Grimsby Town in 1960. This moved Vale to within three points of the play-offs. A poor March dragged them down the table though, as the stadium's capacity was again reduced and the police bill spiralled. In April, Rudge sold David Riley to Peterborough United for £40,000, whilst £20,000 was spent bringing in Gary McKinstry from Portadown. The club's play-off dreams were killed off by a 2–1 defeat from Newcastle United, after which only two points were won from the final four games. Despite this the supporters held popular player Neil Aspin aloft following the team's final home game (a 2–1 defeat to Sunderland). The final game was a goalless draw with Oxford United at the Manor Ground, which was enough to ensure a top-half finish.

They finished in eleventh place with 61 points, their highest finish since 1933–34. Darren Beckford was top-scorer with 21 goals in all competitions, with Nicky Cross and Robbie Earle bagged 15 and 12 goals respectively. The average home attendance of 8,978 was the highest since 1963–64. The players were taken on a holiday to Spain as a reward for their efforts. Rudge retained the entire playing staff at the end of the season.

Finances
The club's shirt sponsors were ABC Minolta Copiers.

Cup competitions
In the FA Cup, Vale were drawn against top-flight Derby County in the Third Round, and progressed 3–2 in the replay at The Baseball Ground having 'gave as good as they received' as they drew the original tie 1–1. The win was 'another famous cup victory' for the club, as three goals were put past Peter Shilton. Another difficult fixture awaited in the Fourth Round. On 27 January, Aston Villa inflicted Vale's biggest ever cup defeat with a 6–0 win in front of 36,532 fans at Villa Park. Nevertheless the cup run raised £150,000.

In the League Cup, Vale overcame Third Division Walsall 3–1 on aggregate, having won 1–0 at home and 2–1 at Fellows Park. They then came unstuck against First Division Wimbledon, losing 2–1 at home before getting beat 3–0 at Plough Lane.

In the short-lived Full Members Cup, Vale made it past the First Round with a 2–1 win over Sunderland at Roker Park, Walker and Cross getting the goals. They were then eliminated by Middlesbrough at the next stage, after losing 3–1 at Ayresome Park despite a Jeffers goal.

League table

Results
Port Vale's score comes first

Football League Second Division

Results by matchday

Matches

FA Cup

League Cup

Full Members Cup

Player statistics

Appearances

Top scorers

Transfers

Transfers in

Transfers out

Loans out

References
Specific

General

Port Vale F.C. seasons
Port Vale